Yasunari Kodama (born ) is a Japanese male volleyball player. He was a part of the Japan men's national volleyball team. He used to play for University of Tsukuba and currently plays for Panasonic Panthers on the club level.

References

External links
 profile at FIVB.org

1994 births
Living people
Japanese men's volleyball players
People from Kagoshima
Sportspeople from Kagoshima Prefecture
Universiade medalists in volleyball
Universiade bronze medalists for Japan
Medalists at the 2017 Summer Universiade